Eriopterodes is a genus of crane fly in the family Limoniidae.

Distribution
Ecuador, Venezuela, Dominica & Mexico.

Species
E. celestis (Alexander, 1940)
E. laetipleura (Alexander, 1938)

References

Limoniidae
Nematocera genera
Diptera of North America
Diptera of South America